Ali Bagov (born February 12, 1990) is a Russian mixed martial artist who competes in the Lightweight and Welterweight divisions of the Absolute Championship Akhmat (ACA). Fight Matrix had him ranked a top 10 lightweight in the world in August 2022. He is ranked #4 in the ACA welterweight rankings.

Background 
Ali Bagov was born on December 2, 1990, in the city of Baksan, Republic of Kabardino-Balkaria. At the age of 19, the fighter began his career in professional MMA. In the same year, the young athlete won "gold" at the Combat Sambo Championship of the Southern Federal District, which was held in Maykop, Krasnodar Territory. In the same year in Yaroslavl, Bagov became the Champion of Russia in the Oriental.  As soon as Bagov turned 18, he decides to move to MMA.

In the next 2010 in Moscow, the fighter took the top step of the podium at the ADCC Russian Grappling Championship class: A. In the same year, in Beslan, he became the Winner of the Combat Sambo Championship of the North Caucasus Federal District. At the end of 2010 in Nalchik, Ali Bagov won the title of Champion of Russia in FCF-MMA. Two years later, the athlete repeated his success by winning the Championship of the All-Russian Combat Sambo Tournament in the city of Nazran.

Mixed martial arts career

Early career
Ali began his professional career in MMA at the age of 19. Then, in 2009, Bagov managed to win an enchanting victory at the combat sambo championship among athletes of the Southern Federal District, which was held in the capital of Adygea, Maykop. In the same year, Ali participated in the Russian Oriental Championship, held in Yaroslavl, and turned out to be a triumph there.

Bagov faced future UFC Lightweight Champion Khabib Nurmagomedov on June 10, 2010, at Golden First of Russia 1. Having a competitive bout with Khabib, Khabib successfully took advantage of the ruleset allowing headbutts, using multiple of them to inflict damage on Bagov from on top, winning the bout against Bagov via unanimous decision. After that fight, Khabib and Ali became very close friends and even started training together.

At the invitation of Nurmagomedov, Bagov began to train in Dagestan. The local wrestlers suggested that Oleg take the Caucasian name Ali, and he agreed. From that moment on, he became better known as Ali Bagov.

Absolute Championship Akhmat 
In 2014, Bagov signed a contract with the largest Chechen promotion ACB (Absolute Championship Berkut), where for the first time he performed at the ACB 2 tournament and defeated Akhmed Mirzaev in the first round via anaconda choke. This was followed by performances at ACB 5 and ACB 7, where Bagov won confident victories with first round submissions. At ACB 9, Bagov lost by spinning back kick knockout in the 3rd round to Abdul Aziz Abdulvakhabov, starting a long term rivalry with him.

After that, Bagov decided to move clubs to Berkut Club and a series of 8 victories in a row followed and Ali Bagov went out for revenge with Abdulvakhabov. However, the 2nd duel was again not in his favor. At the ACB 48 tournament in October 2016, he lost by technical knockout, as he refused to continue the fight after the 1st round.

Another important rival for Bagov was Eduard Vartanyan. They first met him in battle in 2014 in a sambo competition at World Combat Sambo Federation: World Cup 2014, where Ali lost to his opponent by technical knockout in the first round. A year later at ACB 22, he was able to take revenge and defeated Edward with a first round rear-naked choke. At the beginning of March 2018, it was announced that the fighters would again face each other in a fight in early May 2018. However, while preparing for the fight, Vartanyan injured his knee and for some time was forced to move on crutches.

Bagov faced American fighter and Bellator veteran Bubba Jenkins on 11 March 2017 at ACB 54. He won the fight by technical submission in the second round.

Bagov faced Leandro Silva at ACB 80: Tumenov vs. Burrell on February 16, 2018. He won the fight via unanimous decision.

After this fight, Bagov wins 3 victories in a row, Bagov challenged Gleristone Santos at ACB 86 on May 5, 2018. After the instructions, the duel began and the Bagov literally rushed at the Brazilian and after a successful takedown, Bagov began to ground and pound Santos, finishing the Brazilian in the first round via TKO stoppage.

After defeating the Brazilian, Bagov was given another chance against Abdul Aziz Abdulvakhabov for the ACA Lightweight Championship on September 8, 2018, at ACB 89. In the fight, Ali immediately at the beginning of the fight held a takedown on Abdulvakhabov and actively worked throughout the first and second rounds! In the third round, after the transfer of the Chechen to the ground, Bagov simply did not let him get up and every attempt of the Chechen fighter to stand up ended with another transfer to the ground from Ali. Despite Abdulvakhabov making a comeback in the later round, Bagov won the majority decision on the judges scorecard and the ACA Lightweight Title.

On September 27, 2019, Bagov defended his title for the first time, facing Khusein Khaliev in the main event of ACA 99. Bagov would go on to defeat his opponent via kimura in the fourth round.

Moving up to welterweight and relinguishing the ACA Lightweight Championship, after Bagov won his bout against Adam Townsend at ACA 104 via unanimous decision, Bagov challenged Murad Abdulaev on September 5, 2020, at ACA 110 for the vacant ACA Welterweight Championship, losing the bout via unanimous decision.

Attempting to rebound from the loss, Bagov faced Elias Silvério at ACA 117: Bagov vs. Silvério on February 12, 2021. He won the fight via unanimous decision.

Bagov would go on to win his next two bouts, defeating Tilek Mashrapov at ACA 125 via kimura submission in the third round and Andrey Koshkin at ACA 134 via unanimous decision.

Bagov announced that he was returning to lightweight and entering the ACA Lightweight Grand Prix, with his first opponent being Rashid Magomedov with the semifinal bout taking place on July 22, 2022, at ACA 141. The bout ended in a no contest after the president of ACA, Mairbek Khasiev, stopped the bout after the fourth round due to inactivity from both fighters. After Khasiev announced that he wouldn't pay the fighters their purses, Bagov announced that he would leave the promotion if he didn't receive his fee.

Bagov faced Daud Shaikhaev on March 17, 2023 at ACA 154: Vakhaev vs Goncharov, losing the bout via split decision.

Championships and accomplishments

Mixed martial arts 

 Absolute Championship Akhmat
 ACA Lightweight Championship (One time)
 One successful title defence
 2015 ACB Lightweight Grand Prix

Mixed martial arts record

|-
|Loss
|align=center|32–11 (1)
|Daud Shaikhaev	
|Decision (split)
|ACA 154: Vakhaev vs Goncharov
|
|align=center|3
|align=center| 5:00
|Krasnodar, Russia
|
|-
| NC
|align=center|
|Rashid Magomedov
|NC (lack of activity)
|ACA 141: Froes vs. Suleymanov
|
|align=center|4
|align=center| 5:00
|Sochi, Russia
|
|-
|Win
|align=center|32–10
|Andrey Koshkin
|Decision (unanimous)
|ACA 134: Bagov vs. Koshkin
|
|align=center|5
|align=center|5:00
|Krasnodar, Russia
|
|-
|Win
|align=center|31–10
|Tilek Mashrapov
|Submission (kimura)
|ACA 125: Dudaev vs. de Lima
|
|align=center|3
|align=center|3:33
|Sochi, Russia
|
|-
|Win
|align=center|30–10
|Elias Silvério
|Decision (unanimous)
|ACA 117: Bagov vs. Silvério
|
|align=center|3
|align=center|5:00
|Sochi, Russia
|
|-
|Loss
|align=center|29–10
|Murad Abdulaev
|Decision (unanimous)
|ACA 110: Bagov vs. Abdulaev 
|
|align=center|3
|align=center|5:00
|Moscow, Russia
|
|-
|Win
|align=center|29–9
|Adam Townsend
|Decision (unanimous)
|ACA 104: Goncharov vs. Vakhaev 
|
|align=center|3
|align=center|4:01
|Krasnodar, Russia
|
|-
|Win
|align=center|28–9
|Khusein Khaliev
|Submission (kimura)
|ACA 99: Bagov vs. Khaliev 
|
|align=center|4
|align=center|3:41
|Moscow, Russia
|
|-
|Win
|align=center|27–9
|Abdul-Aziz Abdulvakhabov
|Decision (majority)
|ACB 89: Abdulvakhabov vs. Bagov 3 
|
|align=center|3
|align=center|5:00
|Krasnodar, Russia
|
|-
|Win
|align=center|26–9
|Gleristone Santos
|TKO (punches and elbows)
|ACB 86: Balaev vs. Raisov 2 
|
|align=center|1
|align=center|3:47
|Moscow, Russia
|
|-
|Win
|align=center|25–9
|Leandro Silva
|Decision (unanimous)
|ACB 80: Tumenov vs. Burrell 
|
|align=center|3
|align=center|5:00
|Krasnodar, Russia
|
|-
|Win
|align=center|24–9
|Herdeson Batista
|Decision (unanimous)
|ACB 71: Yan vs. Mattos
|
|align=center|3
|align=center|5:00
|Moscow, Russia
|
|-
|Win
|align=center|23–9
|Bubba Jenkins
|Technical Submission (inverted triangle choke)
|ACB 54: Supersonic
|
|align=center|2
|align=center|4:01
|Manchester, England
|
|-
|Loss
|align=center|22–9
|Abdul-Aziz Abdulvakhabov
|TKO (retirement)
|ACB 48: Revenge
|
|align=center|1
|align=center|5:00
|Moscow, Russia
|
|-
|Win
|align=center|22–8
|Renat Lyatifov
|KO (punches)
|ACB 38: Breakthrough
|
|align=center|1
|align=center|0:47
|Rostov-on-Don, Russia
|
|-
|Win
|align=center|21–8
|Artur Lemos
|Submission (rear-naked choke)
|ACB 31: Magomedsharipov vs. Arapkhanov
|
|align=center|1
|align=center|3:49
|Grozny, Russia
|
|-
|Win
|align=center|20–8
|Eduard Vartanyan
|Submission (rear-naked choke)
|ACB 22: St. Petersburg
|
|align=center|1
|align=center|1:16
|St. Petersburg, Russia
|
|-
|Win
|align=center|19–8
|Jakub Kowalewicz
|Submission (armbar)
|ACB 19: Baltic Challenge
|
|align=center|1
|align=center|1:11
|Kaliningrad, Russia
|
|-
|Win
|align=center|18–8
|Thiago Meller
|Submission (guillotine choke)
|ACB 15: Grand Prix Berkut 2015 Stage 2
|
|align=center|1
|align=center|2:51
|Nalchik, Russia
|
|-
|Win
|align=center|17–8
|Radzh Khizriev
|Submission
|RMAU: Battle Of The Champions 7
|
|align=center|1
|align=center|N/A
|Moscow, Russia
|
|-
|Win
|align=center|16–8
|Georgi Stoyanov
|Submission (armbar)
|ACB 11: Vol. 1
|
|align=center|1
|align=center|4:43
|Grozny, Russia
|
|-
|Win
|align=center|15–8
|Kirill Sukhomlinov
|Submission (triangle choke)
|ProFC 54
|
|align=center|2
|align=center|2:05
|Rostov-on-Don, Russia
|
|-
|Loss
|align=center|14–8
|Abdul-Aziz Abdulvakhabov
|KO (spinning back kick)
|ACB 9: Grand Prix Berkut 2014
|
|align=center|3
|align=center|3:36
|Grozny, Russia
|
|-
|Win
|align=center|14–7
|Khamzat Dalgiev
|Submission (triangle choke)
|M-1 Challenge 49
|
|align=center|1
|align=center|0:52
|Dzheyrakh, Russia
|
|-
|Win
|align=center|13–7
|Rustam Bogotov
|Submission (heel hook)
|ACB 7: Grand Prix Berkut 2014
|
|align=center|1
|align=center|0:20
|Grozny, Russia
|
|-
|Win
|align=center|12–7
|Rasul Mansurov
|Submission (triangle choke)
|ACB 5: Grand Prix Berkut 2014 
|
|align=center|1
|align=center|1:04
|Grozny, Russia
|
|-
|Win
|align=center|11–7
|Akhmed Mirzaev
|Submission (anaconda choke)
|ACB 2: Grand Prix Berkut 2014 
|
|align=center|1
|align=center|1:01
|Grozny, Russia
|
|-
|Loss
|align=center|10–7
|Renat Lyatifov
|TKO (retirement)
|Fightspirit Championship 1
|
|align=center|1
|align=center|5:00
|Kolpino, Russia
|
|-
|Win
|align=center|10–6
|Viktor Tchernetsky
|Submission (arm-triangle choke)
|Fight Nights Global 16
|
|align=center|1
|align=center|0:30
|Moscow, Russia
|
|-
|Loss
|align=center|9–6
|Georgi Stoyanov
|TKO (retirement)
|M-1 Challenge 40
|
|align=center|1
|align=center|5:00
|Dzheyrakh, Russia
|
|-
|Win
|align=center|9–5
|Magomed Radzhabov
|Submission (armbar)
|Cup Of St. Petersburg 2013
|
|align=center|1
|align=center|1:17
|St. Petersburg, Russia
|
|-
|Loss
|align=center|8–5
|Magomedrasul Khasbulaev
|KO (punch)
|S-70: Russian Championship Semifinals
|
|align=center|2
|align=center|1:57
|Moscow, Russia
|
|-
|Loss
|align=center|8–4
|Fabiano de Melo
|KO (knee to the body)
|RFC 1: Beirut
|
|align=center|2
|align=center|3:59
|Beirut, Lebanon
|
|-
|Win
|align=center|8–3
|Murad Yusupov
|Submission (triangle choke)
|S-70: Russian Championship First Round
|
|align=center|1
|align=center|1:10
|Volgograd, Russia
|
|-
|Win
|align=center|7–3
|Talekh Aliev
|Submission (triangle choke)
|ProFC 29: Union Nation Cup (Stage 16)
|
|align=center|1
|align=center|1:25
|Rostov-on-Don, Russia
|
|-
|Win
|align=center| 6–3
|Yuriy Kelekhsaev
|Submission (triangle choke)
|FCF-MMA: Absolute Cup 2011
|
|align=center|1
|align=center|0:59
|Nalchik, Russia
|
|-
|Win
|align=center| 5–3
|Sergey Golyaev
|Submission (rear-naked choke)
|ProFC 23: Union Nation Cup (Stage 11)
|
|align=center| 1
|align=center| 4:54
|Bobruisk, Belarus
|
|-
| Win
| align=center| 4–3
| Vladimir Simonyan
|Submission (rear-naked choke)
|ProFC 18: Union Nation Cup (Stage 9)
|
|align=center|1
|align=center|1:02
|Nalchik, Russia
|
|-
| Win
| align=center| 3–3
| Khizri Radzhabov
|Submission (anaconda choke)
|IAFC: Caucasus Cup 3
|
|align=center|1
|align=center|0:30
|Russia
|
|-
| Loss
| align=center| 2–3
| Kirill Sukhomlinov
| TKO (arm injury)
|Pancration Black Sea Cup
|
|align=center|1
|align=center|2:15
|Anapa, Russia
| 
|-
|Loss
|align=center| 2–2
|Khabib Nurmagomedov
|Decision (unanimous)
|Golden Fist Of Russia 1
|
|align=center| 2
|align=center| 5:00
|Moscow, Russia
|
|-
| Loss
| align=center| 2–1
| Alexander Butenko
| Submission (rear-naked choke)
|Global Battle 3
| 
| align=center| 2
| align=center|N/A
|Perm, Russia
|
|-
|Win
|align=center| 2–0
|Ramazan Emeev
|Submission (triangle choke)
|rowspan=2|Global Battle 2
|rowspan=2|
|align=center|1
|align=center|1:30
|rowspan=2|Perm, Russia
|
|-
| Win
| align=center| 1–0
| Rustam Thagabsoev
| Submission (triangle choke)
| align=center| 1
| align=center| 1:09
|

See also 
 List of current ACA fighters
 List of male mixed martial artists

References

External links 
 

1990 births
Living people
Russian male mixed martial artists
Lightweight mixed martial artists
Welterweight mixed martial artists